MacArthur is a 1977 American biographical war film directed by Joseph Sargent and starring Gregory Peck in the eponymous role as American General of the Army Douglas MacArthur.

Plot
The film portrays MacArthur's (Gregory Peck) life from 1942, before the Battle of Bataan in World War II, to 1952, after he had been removed from his Korean War command by President Harry Truman (Ed Flanders) for insubordination. It is recounted in flashback as MacArthur visits West Point in 1962.

Cast
 Gregory Peck as General of the Army Douglas MacArthur
 Ed Flanders as President Harry S. Truman
 Dan O'Herlihy as President Franklin D. Roosevelt
 Ivan Bonar as Lieutenant General Richard K. Sutherland
 Ward Costello as General of the Army George C. Marshall
 Nicolas Coster as Colonel Sidney Huff
 Marj Dusay as Mrs. Jean MacArthur
 Art Fleming as  W. Averell Harriman
 Russell Johnson as Fleet Admiral Ernest J. King
 Sandy Kenyon as Lieutenant General Jonathan M. Wainwright
 Robert Mandan as Representative Martin
 Allan Miller as Colonel LeGrande A. Diller
 Dick O'Neill as Major General Courtney Whitney
 G. D. Spradlin as Major General Robert L. Eichelberger
 Addison Powell as Fleet Admiral Chester W. Nimitz
 Garry Walberg as Lieutenant General Walton Walker
 James Shigeta (deleted scenes) as General Tomoyuki Yamashita

Production
Gregory Peck said, "I admit that I was not terribly happy with the script they gave me, or with the production they gave me which was mostly on the back lot of Universal. I thought they shortchanged the production."

Historical inaccuracies
 In a meeting in Pearl Harbor between President Roosevelt, Admiral Nimitz, and MacArthur to discuss East Asian strategy, MacArthur points to Lingayen Gulf in Western Luzon, calling it Leyte Gulf and referring to it as the site of his re-entry to the Philippines. The Battle of Leyte Gulf and the Battle of Leyte, which included MacArthur's first return to Philippine soil on 20 October 1944, were in the Visayas, in Central Philippines. The Invasion of Lingayen Gulf, with MacArthur making a similarly-dramatic landing in the main island of Luzon, occurred on January 9, 1945.
However, it was commissioned only on 22 July 1945 and so was not used for World War II. However, it won five battle stars during the Korean War.
 The uniform of the Soviet Lieutenant General Kuzma N. Derevyanko is erroneously presented with the shoulder boards of a Soviet senior lieutenant instead of a lieutenant general.
 The Japanese surrender of World War II scene aboard  shows the battleship's 40 mm quad guns covered (mothballed) during the movie.
 When MacArthur and his aides are planning the U.N. landing at Inchon in 1950, they review a map of the Korean peninsula which shows the current armistice line dividing the two Koreas.  That line was not established until 1953.  Their map should have been showing the original line at the 38th parallel.

Reception
MacArthur received mixed reviews, it currently holds a 63% rating on Rotten Tomatoes.

The film is recognized by American Film Institute in the following lists:
 2003: AFI's 100 Years...100 Heroes & Villains:
 General Douglas MacArthur – Nominated Hero

See also
Inchon, another film featuring MacArthur .

References

External links

 
 
 
 
 
 

1977 films
1970s biographical drama films
1970s war films
American biographical drama films
American war films
Biographical films about military leaders
1970s English-language films
Films scored by Jerry Goldsmith
Films directed by Joseph Sargent
Films set in 1942
Films set in 1943
Films set in 1944
Films set in 1945
Films set in 1946
Films set in 1947
Films set in 1948
Films set in 1949
Films set in 1950
Films set in 1951
Films set in 1952
Films set in Japan
Films set in the Philippines
Films shot in California
Films shot in Los Angeles
Films shot in New York (state)
Korean War films
Pacific War films
Films with screenplays by Matthew Robbins
Universal Pictures films
World War II films based on actual events
Films about Douglas MacArthur
Cultural depictions of Franklin D. Roosevelt
Cultural depictions of Harry S. Truman
1977 drama films
Japan in non-Japanese culture
1970s American films